Mughāmis ibn Rumaythah ibn Muḥammad Abī Numayy al-Ḥasanī was a co-Emir of Mecca from 1347 to 1349.

Notes

References

Year of birth missing
Year of death missing
Emirs